The Audi S2 is an Audi two-door sports car, manufactured by the division of quattro GmbH (now Audi Sport GmbH) on the same platform as the Audi 80 (B4) in Neckarsulm, Germany, produced from 1991 to 1995. The Audi S2 is the first car in the Audi S series. In 1994, a more powerful Audi RS 2 Avant was released.

Technical specifications

Gallery

References

External links

 audi.com Audi S2 in official site.

S2
Mid-size cars
Executive cars
Coupés
All-wheel-drive vehicles
Cars introduced in 1990
Cars discontinued in 1995